C&E Inc. (full name Computer & Entertainment Inc.), is a Taiwanese video game development company based in Taipei. Established in the early 1990s, the company developed "unlicensed" titles for the consoles NES and Sega Mega Drive with the exception of Simulation Zoo, which was published by Soft Bank for PlayStation and Sega Saturn.

In 1992, some of its members had left the company for the foundation of Hummer Team, a NES pirate game development studio (that which was defunct in 2010).

The rights of their most well-known Beggar Prince and Super Fighter are now in the hands of North American company Super Fighter Team, which has adapted them to new platforms after translating them into English and performing bug fixes and improvements.

Though C&E is still in business, they no longer produce video game software.

List of C&E games

Official titles

Unreleased titles
 American Crisis (NES)
 Bai-Bai Dino (NES)
 Rolltris (NES)
 Poker (NES)

See also
 List of companies of Taiwan

References

External links
 C&E at Sega Retro

Companies based in Taipei
Software companies of Taiwan
Video game development companies
Video game publishers
Video game companies of Taiwan